The 1998–99 Regionalliga was the fifth season played in the Regionalliga as the third tier of German football.

As in the previous season, the competition was organized in four divisions: Nord, Nordost, West/Südwest and Süd. Each division had 18 teams with the exception of the West/Südwest division with only 17.

Nord 
VfL Osnabrück remained in the Regionalliga, because they lost in the play-offs against Chemnitzer FC. As the loser of the North-Northeast play-offs, Osnabrück competed in another play-off against Eintracht Trier and Kickers Offenbach, but could not qualify for promotion to the 2. Bundesliga.

Kickers Emden, VfL Hasetal Herzlake and Sportfreunde Ricklingen were relegated to the Oberliga.

Final table

Top scorers

Nordost 
Chemnitzer FC won promotion to the 2. Bundesliga by defeating VfL Osnabrück in the play-offs, Spandauer SV and SD Croatia Berlin are relegated to the Oberliga. Eisenhüttenstädter FC Stahl remains in the league due to the forcible relegation of Spandauer SV.

Final table

Top scorers

West/Südwest 
Alemannia Aachen was promoted to the 2. Bundesliga while Eintracht Trier took part in the play-offs against VfL Osnabrück and Kickers Offenbach, but was not promoted. FSV Salmrohr, SpVgg Erkenschwick and FC Remscheid were relegated to the Oberliga while Wuppertaler SV and FC 08 Homburg were forcibly relegated.

Final table

Top scorers

Süd 
SV Waldhof Mannheim was promoted to the 2. Bundesliga while Kickers Offenbach took part in the play-offs against VfL Osnabrück and Eintracht Trier and was promoted to the 2. Bundesliga. SC Weismain and SC Neukirchen 1899 were relegated to the Oberliga.

Final table

Top scorers

Promotion playoffs 
A preliminary decider was contested between the champions of the North and North-East regions. Chemnitzer FC won on aggregate and so were promoted to the 2. Bundesliga.

The loser of the above tie faced the second placed teams from the South and West/South-West regions for a final promotion place. Kickers Offenbach earned promotion to the 2. Bundesliga.

References

External links
 Regionalliga Nord 1998–99  at kicker.de
 Regionalliga Nordost 1998–99  at kicker.de
 Regionalliga West/Südwest 1998–99  at kicker.de
 Regionalliga Süd 1998–99  at kicker.de

1998-99
3
Germ